Calidris is a genus of Arctic-breeding, strongly migratory wading birds in the family Scolopacidae. These birds form huge mixed flocks on coasts and estuaries in winter. Migratory shorebirds are shown to have decline in reproductive traits because of temporal changes of their breeding seasons(Weiser et al., 2018). They are the typical "sandpipers", small to medium-sized, long-winged and relatively short-billed.

Their bills have sensitive tips which contain numerous corpuscles of Herbst. This enables the birds to locate buried prey items, which they typically seek with restless running and probing.

Taxonomy
The genus Calidris was introduced in 1804 by the German naturalist Blasius Merrem with the red knot as the type species.  The genus name is from Ancient Greek kalidris or skalidris, a term used by Aristotle for some grey-coloured waterside birds.

The genus contain 24 species:

 Great knot, Calidris tenuirostris
 Red knot, Calidris canutus
 Surfbird, Calidris virgata
 Ruff, Calidris pugnax
 Broad-billed sandpiper, Calidris falcinellus
 Sharp-tailed sandpiper, Calidris acuminata
 Stilt sandpiper, Calidris himantopus
 Curlew sandpiper, Calidris ferruginea
 Temminck's stint, Calidris temminckii
 Long-toed stint, Calidris subminuta
 Spoon-billed sandpiper, Calidris pygmaea
 Red-necked stint, Calidris ruficollis
 Sanderling, Calidris alba
 Dunlin, Calidris alpina
 Rock sandpiper, Calidris ptilocnemis
 Purple sandpiper, Calidris maritima
 Baird's sandpiper, Calidris bairdii
 Little stint, Calidris minuta
 Least sandpiper, Calidris minutilla
 White-rumped sandpiper, Calidris fuscicollis
 Buff-breasted sandpiper, Calidris subruficollis
 Pectoral sandpiper, Calidris melanotos
 Semipalmated sandpiper, Calidris pusilla
 Western sandpiper, Calidris mauri

References

Weiser, E. L., Brown, S. C., Lanctot, R. B., Gates, H. R., Abraham, K. F., Bentzen, R. L.,
Bêty, J., Boldenow, M. L., Brook, R. W., Donnelly, T. F., English, W. B., Flemming, S.
A., Franks, S. E., Gilchrist, H. G., Giroux, M.-A., Johnson, A., Kennedy, L. V., 
Koloski, L., Kwon, E., & Lamarre, J.-F. (2018). Life‐history tradeoffs revealed by
seasonal declines in reproductive traits of Arctic‐breeding shorebirds. Journal of
Avian Biology., 49(2). https://doi.org/10.1111/jav.01531

 
Sandpipers
Bird genera